Oleksandr Volodymyrovych Batyshchev (born 14 September 1991) is a Ukrainian professional footballer who plays as a midfielder for Torpedo-BelAZ Zhodino.

Career
Batyshchev is the product of the FC Stal Alchevsk sporting system.

Honours
Ordabasy
 Kazakhstan Cup: 2022

References

External links 

1991 births
Living people
People from Rubizhne
Sportspeople from Luhansk Oblast
Ukrainian footballers
Association football midfielders
Ukrainian expatriate footballers
Expatriate footballers in Belarus
Expatriate footballers in Kazakhstan
Ukrainian expatriate sportspeople in Belarus
Ukrainian Premier League players
FC Zorya Luhansk players
PFC Sumy players
FC Stal Alchevsk players
FC Belshina Bobruisk players
FC Krumkachy Minsk players
FC Gomel players
FC Torpedo Minsk players
FC Dnyapro Mogilev players
FC Ordabasy players
FC Torpedo-BelAZ Zhodino players